"La Cartera" ("The Wallet") is a song performed by Colombian singer-songwriter Carlos Vives, taken from his seventh studio album El Amor de Mi Tierra (1999). The song was written by Vives and Andres Castro. It was released in 2000 on EMI Latin as the fourth and final single from the record.

Charts

References

2000 singles
Carlos Vives songs
Spanish-language songs
1999 songs
Songs written by Carlos Vives
EMI Latin singles